Evigan is a surname. Notable people with the surname include:

Briana Evigan (born 1986), American actress, dancer, singer, songwriter and choreographer
Greg Evigan (born 1953), American film, stage, and television actor
Jason Evigan (born 1983), American musician, singer, songwriter and record producer
Vanessa Lee Evigan (born 1981), American actress